The Requienellaceae are a family of fungi in the order Pyrenulales. Species in this family have a widespread distribution, and grow on wood and bark.

References

Pyrenulales
Lichen families
Taxa described in 1986
Eurotiomycetes genera